Dan O'Grady (born: 16 August 1968) is a sailor from Sutton, Dublin, Ireland. who represented his country at the 1996 Summer Olympics in Savannah, United States as crew member in the Soling. With helmsman Marshall King and fellow crew member Garrett Connolly they took the 16th place.

References

Living people
1968 births
Sailors at the 1996 Summer Olympics – Soling
Olympic sailors of Ireland
Sportspeople from Dublin (city)
Irish male sailors (sport)